The 1998 Maine Black Bears football team represented the University of Maine in the 1998 NCAA Division I-AA football season. They played their home games at Alfond Stadium as a member of the Atlantic 10 Conference. They were led by sixth-year head coach Jack Cosgrove. The Black Bears finished the season 6–5, 3–5 in conference play, to finish tied for third in the New England Division.

Previous season

The Black Bears finished the 1997 season with a record of 5–6, with a 4–4 mark in the Atlantic 10 Conference to finish in a tie for second place in the New England Division.

Schedule

References

Maine
Maine Black Bears football seasons
Maine Black Bears football